Playa San Francisco is a resort (balneario) in the Maldonado Department of Uruguay.

Location

It was named honoring businessman Francisco Piria, founder of Piriápolis.

References

External links

Populated places in the Maldonado Department
Seaside resorts in Uruguay